"Tubthumping" is a song released by British rock band Chumbawamba from their eighth studio album, Tubthumper (1997). It is the band's most successful single, peaking at number two on the UK Singles Chart. It topped the charts in Australia, Canada, Ireland, Italy, New Zealand and hit number six on the US Billboard Hot 100 (although it topped the US Modern Rock and Mainstream Top 40 charts). At the 1998 Brit Awards, "Tubthumping" was nominated for the Brit Award for Best British Single. It sold 880,000 copies in the UK.

Background
The song was the group's lead single from Tubthumper, their major-label debut. It was released on 11 August 1997. Vocalist Dunstan Bruce retrospectively observed that, before the group wrote it, they "were in a mess: we had become directionless and disparate". He credited "Tubthumping" with changing that, telling The Guardian, "It's not our most political or best song, but it brought us back together. The song is about us – as a class and as a band. The beauty of it was we had no idea how big it would be."

Writing and composition
A Leeds pub called the Fforde Grene served as the group's inspiration for the song; guitarist Boff Whalley told The Guardian that it was written about "the resilience of ordinary people"; musically, "Tubthumping" is a dance-rock, alternative rock, and dance-punk song in D major.

Critical reception
Larry Flick from Billboard wrote, "Some records just demand attention: 'Tubthumping' is one of the rare few. You can spend three times the track's running time plucking out the seemingly disparate sounds and assorted genre references—starting with the forceful alterna-rock guitar scratches, the hip-hop-derived beats, and the swing-style horns. Holding it all together are the kind of rousing, gang-like chants that you hear at football games. Sounds odd, eh? Well, you won't soon forget this jam after first listen. And you'll likely be hearing it on pop and modern rock stations for months to come. If this gem is indicative of the tone of the act's forthcoming album, it should be quite a head trip." A reviewer from Daily Record described it as an "irritating catchy drinking anthem from the anarchist band". It was also called a "raucous anthem". Pan-European magazine Music & Media said, "After a decade and a half spent as indie heroes this collective is likely to break into the mainstream in a big way". Music Week gave the song four out of five, noting that it "combines their unique sound with a very infectious chant that could have come from the terraces. Radio One's Simon Mayo has been heavily championing the song which should prove to be their biggest hit to date." Ian Hyland of the Sunday Mirror rated it eight out of ten, writing, "Sing a terrace chant, mention lager and the rugby boys will be making boozed-up human pyramids on the dance floor in seconds. And you'll have a monster hit – good work, chum." Troy J. Augusto from Variety declared it as a "drinking-and-dancing anthem" and "the quirk hit of the season".

In The Village Voices Pazz & Jop poll for 1997, "Tubthumping" was voted the second-best single of the year. Australian radio station Triple J ranked it No. 3 in its Triple J Hottest 100 for the same year. Author Bruce Pollock included it in his 2005 book "The 7,500 Most Important Songs of 1944-2000". "Tubthumping" also placed at No. 12 in Rolling Stones 2007 list of the "20 Most Annoying Songs" and at No. 8 in the magazine's 2011 list of the "Top 10 One-Hit Wonders of All Time".

Commercial performance
Upon its release, the song became an international hit. On the UK Singles Chart, it debuted at number two on the chart dated 23 August 1997; it spent three consecutive weeks at number two, held off the top spot by Will Smith's "Men in Black." The song spent 11 consecutive weeks in the top 10, and 20 consecutive weeks on the top 100. On the chart dated 24 January 1998, three weeks after its last week on the chart, the song reentered the singles chart at number 88; the next week, it fell to number 96 before exiting the chart.

In the US, the song debuted on the Billboard Hot 100 dated 13 September 1997, at number 79. The next week, it rose to number 63, attaining the week's biggest gain in airplay. Two weeks later, on the chart dated 4 October 1997, the song was again the biggest airplay gainer of the week, entering the top 40 in its rise from 47 to 35. In its 12th week on the chart, 29 November 1997, the song reached its peak of number six, where it spent two weeks. In total, it spent 31 weeks on the Billboard Hot 100.

The single was also present on many year-end singles charts for 1997. In the UK, it ranked as the year's seventh most-popular single, while it placed at number three on Australia's top 100 songs of the year. The single also placed in the top 20 of the year-end chart in Sweden and in the top 100 of 1997 in Belgium, Canada, Germany, the Netherlands, New Zealand, and the United States. In the US, it placed at number 35 on the Billboard Hot 100's year-end ranking for 1998.

Track listings and formats

 UK CD single
"Tubthumping"
"Tubthumping" (Butthumping Mix)
"Tubthumping" (Danny Boy Mix)
"Tubthumping" (MAWR Mix/Pablo & Lawrie)
"Tubthumping" (Timeshard Mix)
"Tubthumping" (Gunshot Mix)

 UK 7-inch single
A1. "Tubthumping" – 3:33
B1. "Farewell to the Crown" (featuring the Oysterband) – 2:58
B2. "Football Song" ("Shit Ground, No Fans...") – 2:26

 UK cassette single
"Tubthumping" – 3:33
"Tubthumping" (Butthumping Mix) – 5:24
"Tubthumping" (Danny Boy Mix) – 5:37

 European CD single
"Tubthumping" – 3:37
"Farewell to the Crown" (featuring the Oysterband) – 2:55

 US and Australian CD single
"Tubthumping" (original mix)
"Farewell to the Crown" (featuring the Oysterband)
"Football Song" ("Shit Ground, No Fans...")
"Tubthumping" (Butthumping Mix)
"Tubthumping" (Danny Boy Mix)

 US 7-inch single
A. "Tubthumping"
B. "Amnesia"

 US 12-inch single
A1. "Tubthumping" (MAWR Mix/Pablo & Lawrie) – 5:10
A2. "Tubthumping" (original mix) – 3:33
B1. "Tubthumping" (Timeshard Mix) – 4:57
B2. "Tubthumping" (Gunshot Mix) – 5:17

Charts and certifications

Weekly charts

Year-end charts

Certifications

Release history

"Tubthumping" (2003 Remix)

"Tubthumping (remix)" was released in 2003 as a promotional CD by Chumbawamba on Koch Records. The remixed version of the song was done by The Flaming Lips and Dave Fridmann.

The single was released promotionally by Mutt Records, with their previous single, "Jacob's Ladder (Not in My Name)", as a B-side. It was also included on the bonus DVD accompanying Readymades and Then Some, the rerelease of their 2002 album Readymades. Stereogum also made the song available as a free MP3 download in June 2004.

Track listing
 US promo CD
"Tubthumping" (remix)  – 5:20
"Salt Fare, North Sea" – 4:28
"Jacob's Ladder (Not in My Name)" – 2:52

Legacy

A neon sculpture on the Leeds Playhouse features the lyric "I get knocked down but I get up again". During the COVID-19 pandemic in Leeds, the song was given a remix by local young musicians and sportspeople.

Alternative rock band They Might Be Giants covered "Tubthumping" for The A.V. Club's A.V. Undercover series, and included on the compilation album Album Raises New and Troubling Questions.

See also
List of number-one singles in Australia during the 1990s
List of RPM number-one alternative rock singles
List of number-one singles of 1997 (Ireland)
List of number-one singles from the 1990s (New Zealand)
List of Billboard Mainstream Top 40 number-one songs of the 1990s
List of Adult Top 40 number-one songs of the 1990s

References

External links
Song Review at AllMusic

1997 singles
1997 songs
Chumbawamba songs
British alternative rock songs
Dance-punk songs
Dance-rock songs
EMI Records singles
Irish Singles Chart number-one singles
Music videos directed by Ben Unwin
Number-one singles in Australia
Number-one singles in Italy
Number-one singles in New Zealand
Number-one singles in Scotland
Republic Records singles
RPM Top Singles number-one singles
Songs about alcohol
They Might Be Giants songs